Schistosoma spindale is a species of digenetic trematode in the family Schistosomatidae. It causes intestinal schistosomiasis in the ruminants.

The distribution of Schistosoma spindale include Sri Lanka, India, Bangladesh, Thailand, Malaysia, and Laos.

The tegument of Schistosoma spindale under scanning electron microscope was studied in 1983. It is non-tuberculated (Gupta and Agrawal 2002 Comparative scanning electron microscopy of some Indian schistosomes. Journal of Parasitology and Applied Biology 11: 49–54).

The  first intermediate host is a freshwater snail Indoplanorbis exustus that may be the sole natural intermediate host for Schistosoma spindale (and other two Schistosoma species) on the Indian sub-continent.  One snail can produce up to 7,000 cercariae in one day.

The cercariae usually infect some hairy host (low host specificity) in shallow and muddy waters.

The definitive hosts of Schistosoma spindale are (mainly) ruminants and Schistosoma spindale cause intestinal schistosomiasis of ruminants (Artiodactyla, Ruminantia). Surveillance for cattle schistosomiasis is generally inadequate and the literature is limited, but some idea of the problem can be gained from past small scale studies. For a diagnosis there is need to find eggs of Schistosoma spindale in feces. Surveys in Sri Lanka revealed prevalence of Schistosoma spindale of 31.2% (of 901 cattle), whilst in Bangladesh a similarly high prevalence of 36% has been reported. More recently, in Kerala South India, prevalences have been reported  up to 57.3% in cattle, 50% in water buffalo (Bubalus bubalis) and 4.7% in goats. The prevalence of Schistosoma spindale in the animals depend on the diagnostic test employed. Thus, it was as low as 10–30% by faecal examination (again low if egg detection method is employed and high if  hatching method is followed) with as high as 80–95% by examining mesentery of the animals, for alive schistosomes, during post mortem (Agrawal MC 2012. Schistosomes and schistosomiasis in South Asia. Springer (India) Pvt, Ltd, New Delhi). Schistosoma spindale was found causing an outbreak in cattle in Maharashtra leading to heavy mortality with symptoms similar to Rinder pest (Kulkarni HV, Rao SR and Chudhari PG 1954. Unusual outbreak of schistosomiasis in bovines due to Schistosoma spindale associated with heavy mortality in Bombay state. Bombay Veterinary college Magazine 4: 3–15).

Other hosts of Schistosoma spindale include:
 Bandicota indica
 Rattus argentiventer
 Rattus rattus diardii
 Rattus tiomanicus jalorensis

Schistosoma spindale has been implicated of human cercarial dermatitis in India and in Malaysia.

Cladogram 
A cladogram based on 18S ribosomal RNA, 28S ribosomal RNA, and partial cytochrome-c oxidase I (COI)  genes shows phylogenic relations of species in the genus Schistosoma:

References
This article incorporates CC-BY-2.0 text from the reference.

Further reading
 Agrawal M. C. & Southgate V. R. (2000). "Schistosoma spindale and bovine schistosomosis". J Vet Parasitol 14: 95–107.
 
 
 .

Diplostomida
Parasitic animals of mammals
Ruminant diseases
Animals described in 1906